The Schweizer SGU 1-2 was a United States, amateur-built, single-seat,  glider that was designed by Ernest Schweizer and constructed by the Mercury Glider Club between 1930 and 1931.

The 1-2 was the second a line of 38 glider designs that the Schweizers created and the first of over 5700 aircraft built by them.

Design and development

The success of the Schweizer SGP 1-1 as a club glider in the summer of 1930 convinced the Schweizers and the Mercury Glider Club to build an improved glider with better performance for the following year.

The 1-2 was flown by the Mercury Glider Club in the summer of 1931. That club later became the Hudson Valley Soaring Club and continued to operate the glider. The HVSC used the 1-2 as a training glider while they used the prototype Schweizer SGU 1-7 for soaring

Operational history
The club named the 1-2 "The Brick", a reference to its low performance. The sole 1-2 built did not survive and there are no examples available today.

The success of the 1-1 and the 1-2 led the Schweizer brothers to continue on to design and build improved gliders, including a single SGU 1-3 the following year and to form the Schweizer Metal Aircraft Company.

Specifications

See also

References

1930s United States sailplanes
Schweizer aircraft
Homebuilt aircraft
Aircraft first flown in 1931